Alpha Zeta may refer to:

Alpha Zeta (professional), the professional fraternity in the agriculture and natural resources fields
Alpha Zeta (Latin American),  first-known fraternity in the United States founded by international Latin American students (at Cornell University)